"Out on the Street" is a 1974 single by New Zealand band Space Waltz. The song peaked at number one in the New Zealand singles chart in October 1974, becoming the first glam rock song to achieve this distinction. The Bowie-influenced song was largely responsible for Space Waltz winning the "Best New Artist" award at the following year's New Zealand RATA Music Awards.

Background 

Space Waltz was chosen as an entrant is the TVNZ talent series New Faces, and the single, written by lead vocalist Alastair Riddell was recorded as part of this. Space Waltz went on to reach the final of the series, but were unsuccessful. The single, however, had caught the public's attention, and raced to the top of the charts.

Riddell's David Bowie influence was clear, but the song was also largely influenced by the writer's interest in science fiction. It was also a nod to the colourful street-life of Auckland's Queen Street, and particularly the street's transsexual community.

Awards 

As part of APRA's 75th anniversary, its members chose New Zealand's 100 greatest songs of all time. "Out on the Street" was voted into 44th place.

Track listing 

 "Out on the Street" (Riddell)
 "Angel" (Riddell)

Charts

References

Bibliography
Dix, J. (1988) Stranded in paradise: New Zealand rock'n'roll 1955–1988. Wellington: Paradise Publications. 
Sweetman, S. (2012) On song: Stories behind New Zealand's pop classics. Auckland: Penguin New Zealand. 

1974 singles
Number-one singles in New Zealand
Space Waltz songs
1974 songs
EMI Records singles